Chery QQ is a series of city cars produced by Chinese automobile manufacturer Chery Automobile. The first of the series was the QQ hatchback in 2003, later renamed QQ3 in 2006 to sell alongside the QQ6. Other models have been included in the lineup since then. The series includes:

 Chery QQ3 S11 (2003–2015), a 5-door hatchback
 Chery QQ3 S13 (2015–present), a 5-door hatchback
 Chery QQ6 (2006–2010), a 4-door sedan
 Chery QQme (2009–2011), a 3-door hatchback
 Chery QQ Ice Cream (2021–present), a 3-door electric hatchback